Grigorii Nikitich Gribonosov (5 (18) January 1902, Odessa - 30 March 1960, Moscow) was a Soviet journalist and science fiction and adventure writer, who wrote under the name Grigorii Grebnev (Григо́рий Гребнев). He also wrote screenplays, including the adaptation of Alexander Kuprin's story for The White Poodle 1956 film.

Life
He began work at 14 and fought in the Russian Civil War and Second World War, writing for Soviet newspapers and magazines such as Komsomolskaya Pravda. His literary career began in 1930.

1902 births
1960 deaths
Writers from Odesa
Soviet science fiction writers
Soviet male writers
Soviet journalists